Tony Leung Ka-fai (born 1 February 1958) is a Hong Kong actor who is a four-time winner of the Hong Kong Film Award for Best Actor.

As he is often confused with actor Tony Leung Chiu-wai, Tony Leung Ka-fai is known as "Big Tony," while Tony Leung Chiu-wai is known as "Little Tony," nicknames which correspond to the actors' respective age and physical statures.

Career
Leung has been in the film industry for more than 30 years, starring in a variety of roles. His debut film was Burning of the Imperial Palace (1983), where he played the Xianfeng Emperor. He would later work with Chow Yun-fat in three films, Prison on Fire (1987), A Better Tomorrow 3 (1989), and God of Gamblers Returns (1994). He also appeared as Joyce Godenzi's husband in She Shoots Straight, Joyce's trademark film.

In 1991, Leung went to France to appear in Jean-Jacques Annaud's The Lover, based on Marguerite Duras's novel, as the older lover of a young teen schoolgirl, who was played by British actress Jane March.

Leung was originally asked to portray the title character of The Last Emperor (1987) but declined due to prior commitments. The role later went to John Lone.

Leung went on to star in the international horror feature film Double Vision with American actor David Morse. His ongoing career has seen him star in films such as The Myth (2005), Everlasting Regret (2005) and Election (2005).

Leung won his fourth Best Actor award for his performance in Cold War at the 32nd Hong Kong Film Awards.

He also starring in the music video of Mayday's song "Tough" in 2016.

Filmography

References

External links

Tony Leung Ka-fai at Allmovie
Tony Leung Ka-fai at chinesemov.com

1958 births
Living people
Hong Kong male film actors
Alumni of the Hong Kong Polytechnic University
20th-century Hong Kong male actors
21st-century Hong Kong male actors
Hong Kong male television actors
Cantonese people